This list deals with all land based equipment used by the British Armed Forces   during the Cold War period. This includes small arms, artillery, AFVs, SAMs and lorries.

Small arms

Rifles 

 Lee–Enfield-Main service rifle till the 1950s and afterwards adapted for a variety of specialist roles. 
 EM-2 rifle- Experimental rifle adopted very briefly. 
 L1A1 Self-Loading Rifle-Main Cold War service rifle. 
 SA80 L85 rifle-Adopted right at the end of the Cold War.

Sniper rifles 

 Accuracy International Arctic Warfare- Designated L96A1 replaced L42A1a Lee enfield variant in 1985.

Sidearms 

 Enfield No. 2- In service early on in the Cold War. 
 Webley Revolver- Substitute for Enfield No 2. 
 Browning Hi-Power- Main sidearm during the Cold War.

Machine guns 

 Vickers machine gun-Not declared obsolete till 1968.
 Bren light machine gun-L4 variant in service throughout the Cold War.
 FN MAG- Main British machine gun of Cold War and present day as L7.

Submachine guns 

 Sten- Used very early on replaced in 1960
 Sterling submachine gun- Main submachine gun

Grenades 

 Mills bomb- In use till 1970s
 M26 grenade- L2 variant replaced the Mills bomb.

Infantry anti-tank weapons 

 PIAT-still in use in 1950s
 M20 Super Bazooka-Replaced PIAT used early on. 
 Carl Gustaf 8.4cm recoilless rifle
 MILAN-standard from the 1970s for the rest of the Cold War. 
 M72 LAW

Mortars 

 Two-inch mortar-Still in use till 1965
 L9A1 51 mm light mortar- Main Cold War  light mortar
 ML 3-inch mortar- in service through to the 1960s
 L16 81mm mortar- Main Cold War and present day mortar.
 ML 4.2-inch mortar- saw service in 1960s

Artillery

Field artillery 

 M116 howitzer- Saw use into 1950s in its mountain and airborne artillery role
 Ordnance QF 25-pounder- Still saw active use till 1960s when they were relegated to non-combat roles. 
 OTO Melara Mod 56-Saw short service as L5 pack howitzer from 1960s to mid 1970s.
 L118 light gun-entered service in mid 1970s and today is main field artilley piece.

Self propelled artillery 

 Sexton (artillery)- Saw service till 1956
 FV433 Abbot SPG- Main light SPG
 M109 howitzer- Main heavy SPG
 M270 Multiple Launch Rocket System- acquired late in the Cold War

Heavy anti-tank weapons 

 120 mm BAT recoilless rifle-Replaced in 1970s

Anti-aircraft weapons

Anti-aircraft guns 

 Bofors 40 mm gun- L/70 variant used till 1977 in low altitude air defence

Surface to air missiles 

 Thunderbird (missile)- In use till 1977 for mobile high altitude air defence. 
 Bloodhound (missile)-Fixed air defence in UK from 1958 till 1991.
 Blowpipe (missile)- Man portable surface to air missile from 1975 til 1985
 Rapier (missile)-Came into service at start of 70s and at the end replaced bofors and thunderbird. Still in use. 
 Javelin (surface-to-air missile)- Man portable surface to air missile replacing Blowpipe in use from 1984 to 1993.

Armoured fighting vehicles(AFV's)

Tanks 

 Centurion- main British early Cold War tank. 
 Conqueror- used from mid 50s to mid 60s to give long range anti-tank support to Centurions. Built to counter IS-3. 
 Chieftain- main British tank of Cold War and mid Cold War.
 Challenger 1- Main British tank late Cold War or 1980s.

Light tanks 

 FV107 Scimitar-Entered service 1971
 FV101 Scorpion-Entered service 1973

Armoured cars 

 Daimler Armoured Car
 Coventry armoured car
 Ferret armoured car
 Alvis Saladin

Armoured personnel carriers 

 Alvis Saracen-Introduced 1952
 FV432- Introduced in 1960s
 FV103 Spartan-Introduced in 1978
 Saxon (vehicle)- Introduced in 1983

Infantry fighting vehicles 

 Warrior tracked armoured vehicle

Non-combat vehicles

Lorries 

 Bedford RL
 Bedford TM

References

Cold War military equipment of the United Kingdom
Cold War artillery of the United Kingdom
Small arms